Sack is a five-piece Irish band, based in Dublin. To date the band has released three albums: You Are What You Eat, Butterfly Effect and Adventura Majestica. The band formed after the demise of Lord John White.

Their first single "What Did The Christians Ever Do For Us?" was single of the week in both the NME and Melody Maker. They have supported Morrissey on several world tours taking in mainland Europe, North America, and the UK. Sack have also supported the likes of The Fall, Boo Radleys among others. They have gigged sporadically in recent years and are planning to record new material.

The band appeared on the Morrissey-endorsed NME CD Songs to Save Your Life, while "Laughter Lines" appeared on the soundtrack to the movie Carrie 2: The Rage.

Current members
Martin McCann: lead vocals
John Brereton: guitars
Tony Brereton: drums, backing vocals
Ken Haughton: guitars
Derek Lee: bass

Discography
Albums 

 You Are What You Eat (1994) Lemon Records
 Butterfly Effect (1997) Dirt Records
 Adventura Majestica (2001) Jetset Junta Records

Singles 

 Dilettanti  (1993)
 Indian Rope Trick. (1993)
 What Did The Christians Ever Do For Us (1994)
 Latitude (1997)
 Laughter Lines (1998)
 What a Way to Live (2021)

References

External links
Official site

Irish rock music groups
Musical groups from Dublin (city)
Musical groups established in 1994